Miguel Santos may refer to:

Sportspeople
 Miguel Santos (footballer) (born 1994), Portuguese football goalkeeper
 Miguel Santos Soares (born 1984), football defender
 Miguel Reina Santos (born 1946), Spanish retired footballer who played as a goalkeeper
 Miguel Santos Alfageme (born 1991), Spanish footballer playing for UD Logroñés

Others
 Miguel Mihura Santos (1905–1977), Spanish playwright
 Miguel Santos (actor) (fl. 1930s), Cuban actor, see List of Cuban films

Fictional characters
 Living Lightning (Miguel Santos), superhero

See also 
 Miguel de los Santos (disambiguation)